The following list of Canadians by net worth includes the wealthiest Canadian individuals and families as determined by the Bloomberg Billionaires Index and The World's Billionaires by Forbes. In addition to Bloomberg and Forbes, there are other organizations and publications that also measure the wealth of high net-worth individuals and families.

List of Canadians by net worth
Several publications have produced listing of the world's wealthiest people by net worth, including Bloomberg and Forbes. However, there are differences between these listings, with the number of billionaires that exist, as well as their estimated net worth.

According to Canadian Business, in November 2017 there were at least 100 Canadian billionaires when using the Canadian dollar to evaluate net worth. This number differs from The World's Billionaires by Forbes, and the Bloomberg Billionaires Index, as they both use the United States dollar to evaluate net worth. Publications may also provide different estimates for an individual's net worth, leading to disagreement between the publications.

Several Canadian individuals/families that hold multiple citizenships and have a net worth exceeding C$1 billion may also not be listed as Canadians by the aforementioned publications. For example, Elon Musk, considered to be the richest person in the world as of October 2022, holds multiple citizenships, including Canadian citizenship; although Bloomberg and Forbes''' listing of billionaires list Musk as an American.

Bloomberg

Bloomberg L.P. maintains a daily ranking of the net worth analysis of the world's richest people in the world on the Bloomberg Billionaires Index, which is updated "at the close of every trading day in New York". The results are published on the profile page of each individual billionaire. Bloomberg's listing only evaluates the net worth of individuals.

The following is a list of the wealthiest individuals with "Canada" listed as their "Country/Region" according to Bloomberg's daily listing, the Bloomberg Billionaires Index, as of 22 May 2022.

Forbes
Forbes magazine's annual listing of billionaires entitled The World's Billionaires is based on March 18, 2020 "stock prices and exchange rates" in US dollars. They collaborate with FactSet Research Systems, Orbis, PitchBook Data, Real Capital Analytics, Reonomy, S&P Capital IQ, and VesselsValue to collect data.

The following is a list of the wealthiest Canadian individuals and families according to the Forbes' annual The World's Billionaires listing for 2021.

Historical
The richest Canadian to have ever lived is believed to be Herbert Samuel Holt, who had an estimated net worth of $3 billion  in 1928.

Other measurements and rankings of net worth
Statistics Canada
Statistics Canada uses the Survey Financial Security Public Use Microdata File (SFS PUMF) as their principal "family wealth microdata product".

Parliamentary Budget Officer
In September 2019, the Office of the Parliamentary Budget Officer (PBO)—an independent, non-partisan office that supports the work of parliamentarians by providing authoritative financial and economic analysis of issues related to public monies—published a two-page cost estimate of the "fiscal revenues of an annual tax on the net wealth of high-net-worth families above $20 million". The report was one of 200, requested by the political parties in the months leading up to the 2019 federal election. At that time, the main "family wealth microdata product" used by Statistics Canada—the Survey Financial Security Public Use Microdata File (SFS PUMF)—was found to result in "underreporting" and "missing data." In their 2017 list that ranked Canada's top 100 richest people, Toronto-based Rob McEwen of McEwen Mining, ranked 100th with a net worth of C$875 million, while number 1 on the list—the Toronto-based Thomson family of Thomson Reuters—had a net worth of C$39.13 billion. However, the SFS PUMF only reported on the wealth of families with $27 million or less.

In their June 2020 report, the PBO introduced their new "analytic resource" developed to "address the data gap." Their new modelling approach provides a more reliable estimate of family wealth at the top tail of wealth distribution in Canada. Using publicly available data from Canadian Business (CB) magazine and Statistics Canada's micro dataset, the OPBO created a new synthetic micro dataset called the High-net-worth Family Database (HFD) that recalibrates the SFS PUMF by adding a "synthetic dataset of families with wealth over $3 million". Using the more finely grained micro data base, PBO found that the share of the wealth held by top 1% wealthiest Canadian families is 12% higher than the share previously reported using the SFS PUMF. The PBO says that the discrepancy may be due to higher incidences of high net worth families not responding to the SFS. For example, comparing the two surveys based on 2016 data, the SFS PUMF had estimated the wealth held by the top 1% wealthiest Canadians as 13.7%, while the newer calibrated database HFD produced an estimate of 25.6%.

Canadian BusinessCanadian Business'', has also published an annual ranking of the wealthiest Canadian individuals and families since 1998. The magazine has published complete rankings of the "100 wealthiest individuals and families in Canada", an "annual guide to the richest people in Canada—how much they're worth, how they made their fortunes, and the companies that got them there." The most recent available list is updated to 2018. Examples of previous years include 2017, 2016, 2015, 2014, and 2013.

The Thomson Family increased their wealth by 30% from over C$26 billion in 2013 to over C$30 billion in 2014, reaching over C$39.13 billion by 2017.

See also
 Lists of people by net worth

Notes

References 

Net worth
Lists of people by wealth
 
Canada economy-related lists